Cytherea elegans is a species of bee flies (flies in the family Bombyliidae). It is found in France.

References

External links 

 

Bombyliidae
Insects described in 1930
Asilomorph flies of Europe
Taxa named by Sergey Paramonov (entomologist)